Young Jean Lee is an American playwright, director, and filmmaker. She was the Artistic Director of Young Jean Lee's Theater Company, a not-for-profit theater company dedicated to producing her work. She has written and directed ten shows for Young Jean Lee's Theater Company and toured her work to over thirty cities around the world.  Lee was called "the most adventurous downtown playwright of her generation" by Charles Isherwood in The New York Times and "one of the best experimental playwrights in America" by David Cote in Time Out New York. With the 2018 production of Straight White Men at the Hayes Theater, Lee became the first Asian American woman to have a play produced on Broadway.

Background
Lee was born in South Korea and moved to the United States when she was two years old. She grew up in Pullman, Washington and attended college at UC Berkeley, where she majored in English and graduated Phi Beta Kappa. Immediately after college, Lee entered UC Berkeley's English Ph.D. program, where she studied Shakespeare for six years before moving to New York to become a playwright. She received an MFA from Mac Wellman's playwriting program at Brooklyn College.

Works

Theater
Lee's plays have been presented in New York City at, The Public Theater (Straight White Men), the Baryshnikov Arts Center (Untitled Feminist Show), LCT3/Lincoln Center Theater (We're Gonna Die), Joe's Pub (We're Gonna Die), Soho Repertory Theater (Lear), The Appeal, The Kitchen (The Shipment) The Public Theater (Church), P.S. 122 (Church), Pullman, Washington, HERE Arts Center (Songs of the Dragons Flying to Heaven), and the Ontological-Hysteric Theater (Groundwork of the Metaphysics of Morals). Her work has toured venues in Paris, Vienna, Hannover, Berlin, Zurich, Brussels, Budapest, Sydney, Melbourne, Bergen, Brighton, Hamburg, Oslo, Trondheim, Rotterdam, Salamanca, Graz, Seoul, Zagreb, Toulouse, Toronto, Calgary, Antwerp, Vienna, Athens, London, Chicago, Chapel Hill, Los Angeles, Portland, Seattle, San Francisco, Philadelphia, Columbus, Pittsburgh, Boston, New Hampshire, Williamstown, and Minneapolis. Lee is currently under commission from Lincoln Center Theater, and the Oregon Shakespeare Festival.

Plays

 Straight White Men (2014)
 Untitled Feminist Show (2011)
 We're Gonna Die (2011)
 Lear (2010)
 The Shipment (2009)
 Church (2007)
 Songs of the Dragons Flying to Heaven (2006)
 Pullman, WA (2005)
 The Appeal (2004)
 Groundwork of the Metaphysic of Morals (2003)
 Yaggoo (2003)

Film
Her first short film, Here Come the Girls, had its world premiere at the Locarno International Film Festival, its U.S. premiere at the Sundance Film Festival, and its New York premiere at BAMcinemaFest.

Music
Her band, Future Wife, released their debut album, We’re Gonna Die,  in 2013. The band features members of various New York projects, including Cloud Becomes Your Hand, San Fermin, Field Guides, and Landlady. Young Jean Lee and Future Wife performed the show, We're Gonna Die, with David Byrne at his Meltdown Festival in London (Southbank Centre) in August 2015.

Affiliations
Outside her own company, Lee has worked with Radiohole and the National Theater of the United States of America. She is on the board of Yaddo, is a former member of New Dramatists and 13P, and has been awarded residencies from Yaddo, the MacDowell Colony, the Ucross Foundation, Hedgebrook, the Park Avenue Armory, Orchard Project, HERE Arts Center, and Brooklyn Arts Exchange.

Lee is currently an Associate Professor of Theater and Performance Studies at Stanford University.

Publications
Theatre Communications Group has published all 11 of Lee's plays in four books: Songs of the Dragons Flying to Heaven and Other Plays; The Shipment and Lear; We're Gonna Die, and Straight White Men/Untitled Feminist Show. Other publications include: Three Plays by Young Jean Lee<ref>Three Plays by Young Jean Lee (Groundwork of the Metaphysic of Morals, The Appeal, Pullman, WA')'Samuel French, Spring 2006.</ref> (Samuel French, Inc.), New Downtown Now (an anthology edited with Mac Wellman), and An Interview with Richard Foreman in American Theatre magazine.

Awards
Lee is the recipient of a Guggenheim Fellowship, two OBIE Awards, a Prize in Literature from the American Academy of Arts and Letters, a Doris Duke Performing Artist Award, a Doris Duke Artist Residency, a Foundation for Contemporary Arts Grants to Artists award (2006), and the ZKB Patronage Prize of the Zürcher Theater Spektakel. She has also received funding from the National Endowment for the Arts, the New York State Council on the Arts, the Rockefeller Foundation MAP Fund, the Andrew Mellon Foundation, Creative Capital, the Greenwall Foundation, the Jerome Foundation, the New York Foundation for the Arts, the Arts Presenters/Ford Foundation Creative Capacity Grant, the Barbara Bell Cumming Foundation, and the New England Foundation for the Arts: National Theater Project Award. She won the 2016 PEN/Laura Pels Theater Award. She won the 2019 Windham–Campbell Literature Prize in Drama.

References

External links

 Young Jean Lee's Theater Company Official Website
 Young Jean Lee's Theater Company's Press and Publications Archive
 2008 Bomb Magazine interview of Young Jean Lee by Richard Maxwell

American theatre directors
Women theatre directors
21st-century American dramatists and playwrights
American dramatists and playwrights of Korean descent
American writers of Korean descent
Brooklyn College alumni
Obie Award recipients
People from Daegu
Postmodern theatre
South Korean emigrants to the United States
University of California, Berkeley alumni
American women dramatists and playwrights
1974 births
Living people
21st-century American women writers